Oblique angle may refer to:
An angle which is not a multiple of 90°
Another word for "Dutch angle" in cinematography